The Outspan was a South African weekly magazine (1927–1957), continued as the fortnightly Personality (6 June 1957 – 23 December 1965). Its subtitle was "South Africa's Weekly for Everybody". It was published in Bloemfontein by The Friend Newspapers Ltd, first appearing on 4 March 1927, and is said to have been established following the pattern of the British Everybody's, which was set up in 1913.

Contributors
Contributors are said to have included: Agatha Christie, Wernher von Braun, Admiral Donitz, Stuart Cloete, Denis Compton, Eddie Cantor, Major-General Sir Francis de Guingand, Donald Campbell, P. G. Wodehouse, Viscount Montgomery, Adolf Eichmann and Manuel Fangio.

Dorothy Kay produced two to four illustrations for The Outspan every week from 1927 to 1945, and Frank Bellamy published a series of illustrations in 1955–1956.

Sample contents
The 28 January 1949 issue is described as containing "pictures, articles, features and fiction".

Items included:
"The Beautiful Madness" by Mildred Cram
Johannesberg
What it means to provide 3,500,000 meals a year on the railways
Gossip about players who appear on the South African screen
"It all happened in a crowded Durban tearoom" by June Holme
Cricket - the Australians will bring a strong pace attack to South Africa this year
Smuts
"My mother said I never should" by Ann Butler

References

External links

Weekly magazines published in South Africa
Magazines established in 1927
Magazines disestablished in 1957
Defunct magazines published in South Africa